Jeremy Campbell (born August 19, 1987, in Perryton, Texas) is a Paralympic athlete from the United States competing mainly in category P44 pentathlon events.

He competed at the 2008 Summer Paralympics in Beijing, China. There he won a gold medal and set a world record in the men's Pentathlon - P44 event, won a gold medal in the men's discus throw - F44 event, and finished fourth in the men's long jump - F42/44 event.

He is a brother of National Football League player and Army alumnus Caleb Campbell.

References

External links
 
 
 
 

1987 births
Living people
American male discus throwers
American male long jumpers
American pentathletes
World record holders in Paralympic athletics
Paralympic track and field athletes of the United States
Paralympic gold medalists for the United States
Paralympic medalists in athletics (track and field)
Athletes (track and field) at the 2008 Summer Paralympics
Athletes (track and field) at the 2020 Summer Paralympics
Medalists at the 2008 Summer Paralympics
Medalists at the 2012 Summer Paralympics
Medalists at the 2020 Summer Paralympics
Medalists at the 2007 Parapan American Games
Medalists at the 2015 Parapan American Games
Medalists at the 2019 Parapan American Games
People from Perryton, Texas
Track and field athletes from Texas
University of Central Oklahoma alumni
20th-century American people
21st-century American people